The Miss Bahamas Universe 2018 pageant was held on September 16, 2018. This year only 20 candidates were competing for the national crown for Miss Universe. Danielle Grant represented Bahamas at the Miss Universe 2018. Grant succeeded predecessor, Yasmine Cooke of Nassau. The First Runner Up entered Miss Intercontinental and the Second Runner Up entered Miss Supranational.

Final Results

Special Awards

Official Delegates

External links
Official Website

Miss Bahamas
Bahamas, The
2018 in the Bahamas